The Global High-Level Panel on Water and Peace was created in 2015 in Geneva at the initiative of 15 co-convening UN Member States to analyse water in the context of maintaining peace and security and to move this issue from a technical to a political level. Chaired by Dr. Danilo Türk, the former President of the Republic of Slovenia, the Panel presented its landmark report, A Matter of Survival, in Geneva in 2017. The Geneva Water Hub, acted as Secretariat to the Panel. The Strategic Foresight Group was the main intellectual partner of the Panel.

Work of The Panel 
The High Level Panel on Water and Peace focused on the nexus between water and co-operation and how this maintains peace and security. This included preventive activities and arrangements, such as trans-border water cooperation regimes and institutions, the protection of water infrastructure during armed conflicts and water arrangements in the context of post-conflict peace-building.

Over a period of two years the Panel held consultations and public hearings with all relevant organisations and stakeholders to:

 Develop a set of proposals aimed at strengthening the global architecture to prevent and resolve water-related conflicts;
 Facilitate the role of water as an important factor of building peace and cooperation; and
 Enhance the relevance of water issues in national and global policy making.

List of Panelists

Chair 
 Dr. Danilo Türk, former President of the Republic, Slovenia

Vice Chairs 
 Mr. Mansour Faye, Minister of Water and Hydraulics, Senegal
 Dr. Alvaro Umaña Quesada, former Minister of Energy and Environment, Costa Rica

Members (by order of nomination by co-convening country) 
 Prof. Laurence Boisson de Chazournes, Professor of Law at University of Geneva, Switzerland
 Dr. Claudia Patricia Mora, former Vice Minister for Water and Sanitation, Colombia
 Dr. Pascual Fernández, former State Secretary for Water and Seashore, Spain
 Prof. Andras Szöllösi-Nagy, former Rector of UNESCO-IHE Institute for Water Education, Hungary
 His Royal Highness Prince Hassan bin Talal, Jordan
 Mr. Yerlan Nysanbayev, Vice-Minister of Ministry of Agriculture, Kazakhstan
 Mr. Mike Allen Hammah, former Minister for Lands and Natural Resources, Ghana
 Mr. Ciarán Ó Cuinn, Director of Middle East Desalination Research Centre, Oman
 Mr. Andres Tarand, former Prime Minister, Estonia
 Mr. Thor Chetha, Secretary of State of Ministry of Water Resources and Meteorology, Cambodia (acting on an interim basis, nominee to be announced)
 Mr. Franck Galland, Managing Director of Environmental Emergency & Security Services, France
 Mr. Abdelaaziz Ameziane, General Engineer, Ministry of Water, Morocco

Group of Friends on Water and Peace 
In response to the high interest generated by The High Level Panel on Water and Peace, a Group of Friends on Water and Peace was created in early 2016. It provides participating countries with the opportunity to interact with the work of the Panel and offers them a platform for regular dialogue on the issues and recommendations in A Matter of Survival.

References

External links 

 Report of the Global High Level Panel on Water and Peace
 Eighth session of the Meeting of the Parties to the Water Convention
 Deputy Secretary-General's remarks at the High-Level Panel on Water Diplomacy
 Transforming water into a source of cooperation and peace
 A Matter of Survival - Report of the Global High-Level Panel on Water and Peace
 Water... a tool for peace
 Dr. Danilo Türk, Chair of the Global High-Level Panel on Water and Peace and Former President of Slovenia Named 2018 U.S. Water Leader Award Recipient, During Week of Progress on Global Water Security
 Global panel seeks effective policies to protect water resources

Water and society
International nongovernmental organizations
Water organizations